Two ships of the United States Navy have been named Chauvenet, in honor of William Chauvenet.

 , was a  named YMS-195, reclassified as a survey ship and renamed in 1945.
 , was a coastal survey ship, later transferred to Texas A&M University as the training ship MV Texas Clipper II, and then to the Missile Defense Agency as MV Pacific Collector.

United States Navy ship names